Boris Martinec (born 27 November 1988, in Zagreb) is a Croatian former competitive figure skater. He is the 2006 Merano Cup bronze medalist and a seven-time (2004, 2005, 2007–11) Croatian national champion. He qualified to the free skate at the 2007 European Championships in Warsaw and 2009 European Championships in Helsinki.

Programs

Competitive highlights

References

External links

 

1988 births
Living people
Croatian male single skaters
Sportspeople from Zagreb
Competitors at the 2009 Winter Universiade
21st-century Croatian people